Kheir Ali Khamis (born 11 September 1950) is a Tanzanian CCM politician and Member of Parliament for Kwamtipura constituency since 2010.

References

1950 births
Living people
Tanzanian Muslims
Chama Cha Mapinduzi MPs
Tanzanian MPs 2010–2015
Institute of Finance Management alumni